Sharj Sharin is a village in eastern Yemen. It is located in the Hadhramaut Governorate near the B 19 road.

References

Populated places in Hadhramaut Governorate